Bang the World Tour was the fourth concert tour by singer Jane Zhang, in support of her sixth studio album, The Seventh Sense.

Background 
In January 2015, Jane Zhang sang "Bang Bang" in the Chinese TV show "I Am a Singer". Subsequently, she was appointed as the Chinese Cultural Exchange Ambassador of the MLB Major League Baseball. Whether it is a song called "Bang Bang" or a "bang" hitting sound in baseball, "bang" always makes people excited, it represents a kind of vitality. So, Jane named the tour with "BANG the World tour".

Shows

References 

2015 concert tours
Jane Zhang concert tours